Yahoo! Inc. is an American multinational technology company that focuses on media and online business. It is the second and current incarnation of the company, after Verizon Communications acquired the core assets of its predecessor and merged them with AOL in 2017. The resulting subsidiary entity was briefly called Oath Inc. In December 2018, Verizon announced it would write down the combined value of its purchases of AOL and Yahoo! by $4.6 billion, roughly half; the company would be renamed Verizon Media the following month in January 2019.

On May 3, 2021, Verizon announced that 90 percent of the division would be acquired by American private equity firm Apollo Global Management for roughly $5 billion, and would simply be known as Yahoo; Verizon would retain a 10 percent stake in the new group. The acquisition was completed on September 1, 2021.

History

Under Verizon (2017–2021)
The company maintains dual headquarters at the former AOL and Yahoo! headquarters buildings in Manhattan, New York, and Sunnyvale, California, respectively. , the company employed about 10,350 people.

A year after the completion of the AOL acquisition, Verizon announced a $4.8 billion deal for Yahoo!'s core Internet business, to invest in the Internet company's search, news, finance, sports, video, emails and Tumblr products. Yahoo! announced in September and December 2016 two major Internet security breaches affecting more than a billion customers. As a result, Verizon lowered its offer for Yahoo! by $350 million to $4.48 billion.

The AOL deal and subsequent Yahoo! purchase were led by Verizon's management team, including Lowell McAdam (CEO), Marni Walden (EVP Product) and Tim Armstrong. Walden had been tasked with merging the two entities and delivering on the promise of moving Verizon from an analog to digital platforms business. Walden exited Verizon in 2017 and as later events revealed, the integration did not deliver the expected value.

Two months before closing the deal for Yahoo!, Verizon announced it would place Yahoo! and AOL under an umbrella named Oath. The deal closed on June 13, 2017, and Oath was launched. Upon completion of the deal, Yahoo! CEO Marissa Mayer resigned. Yahoo! operations not acquired in the deal were renamed Altaba, a holding company whose primary assets are its 15.5 percent stake in Alibaba Group and 35.5 percent stake in Yahoo! Japan. After the merger, Oath cut fifteen percent of the Yahoo-AOL workforce. In 2018, Altaba sold Yahoo! Japan to SoftBank Group.

In April 2018, Helios and Matheson acquired the Moviefone movie listings website from Oath. As part of the transaction, Verizon took a stake in Helios and Matheson Analytics stock.

In May 2018, Verizon and Samsung agreed to terms that would preload four Oath applications ("apps") onto Samsung Galaxy S9 smartphones. The agreement includes Oath's Newsroom, Yahoo! Sports, Yahoo! Finance, and go90 mobile video apps (closed in July 2018), with integration of native Oath advertisements into both the Oath apps and Samsung's own Galaxy and Game Launcher apps.

On September 12, 2018, it was announced that K. Guru Gowrappan would succeed Tim Armstrong as CEO, effective October 1.

On December 3, 2018, the company declared a new set of rules for the Tumblr community that took effect December 17, 2018, banning "adult content". This move raised objections that it harms their LGBTQ community, sexual abuse survivors, sex workers, adult content blogs, and other bloggers. The move came after the Tumblr app was removed from the Apple App Store due to issues with child pornography, leading some to speculate that the ban may have been made to regain access to the App Store.

In December 2018, Verizon announced that it was cutting 10% of Oath's workforce and would write down the value of the business by $4.6B. Verizon management blamed competitive pressures and that the business never achieved the anticipated benefits. The move wiped out all of the goodwill on the balance sheets that accompanied the acquisitions.

On January 8, 2019, Oath was renamed Verizon Media.

In April 2018, Verizon sold Flickr to SmugMug, for an undisclosed amount.

In August 2019, Verizon sold Tumblr to Automattic, the owner of WordPress.com, for an undisclosed amount which was reportedly less than $3 million.

In November 2020, Verizon sold HuffPost to BuzzFeed. in an all-stock deal, remaining minority shareholder in Buzzfeed.

As Yahoo (2021–present)
On May 3, 2021, Verizon announced that the Verizon Media would be acquired by Apollo Global Management for roughly $5 billion, and would simply be known as Yahoo following the closure of the deal, with Verizon retaining a minor 10% stake in the new group. The acquisition was completed on September 1, 2021, with the company now known as Yahoo.

On September 10, 2021, Jim Lanzone, who had most recently served as CEO of Tinder, was named CEO of Yahoo, succeeding Gowrappan.

Brands 
Some of the digital media brands under Yahoo include:

 AOL
 Autoblog
 Built by Girls
 Engadget
 Flurry
 In the Know
 Makers
 Rivals
 TechCrunch
 Yahoo! (including Yahoo! Sports, Yahoo! Finance, Yahoo! Mail, Yahoo! News, Yahoo! Life, Yahoo! Entertainment, Yahoo Fantasy and Yahoo! Sportsbook.)

Divested 
 Flickr (sold to SmugMug in 2018)
 Moviefone (sold to Helios and Matheson in 2018)
 Polyvore (sold and merged into SSENSE in 2018)
 MapQuest (sold to System1 in 2019)
 Tumblr (sold to WordPress.com owner Automattic in 2019)
 HuffPost (sold to BuzzFeed in 2020)
 Edgecast (sold and merged into Edgio in 2022)

It had partial ownership of Moviefone's former parent company, Helios and Matheson Analytics Inc., until its liquidation in 2020.

Discontinued 
 Alto Mail (discontinued on December 10, 2017)
 AIM (discontinued on December 15, 2017)
 go90 (closed on July 31, 2018)
 Yahoo! Messenger (discontinued on July 17, 2018)
 Yahoo! Together (discontinued in April 2019)

References

External links 
 

 
2017 establishments in New York City
American companies established in 2017
Apollo Global Management companies
Internet properties established in 2017
Mass media companies established in 2017
Mass media companies based in New York City
Mass media companies of the United States
Online mass media companies of the United States
2021 mergers and acquisitions
Re-established companies